The Caldes rabbit is a Spanish breed of rabbit. It is a terminal sire used to cross breed with other rabbits for meat. They are primarily found in albino.

See also

List of rabbit breeds

References

Rabbit breeds
Rabbit breeds originating in Spain